The 2010–11 FA Cup (known as The FA Cup sponsored by E.ON for sponsorship reasons) was the 130th season of the world's oldest football knockout competition; the FA Cup. A total of 806 clubs applied to enter of which 759 were accepted, a slight drop compared to the 762 clubs accepted into the 2009–10 competition.

The competition commenced on 14 August 2010 with the Extra preliminary round and concluded on 14 May 2011 with the Final, held at Wembley Stadium. Unusually, this was not the last game of the English domestic season nor the only game played on that day. Wembley Stadium was also hosting the 2011 Champions League Final on 28 May, forcing the FA Cup Final to be played at least two weeks earlier. This meant the Final was played on the penultimate weekend of the Premier League season and, apart from the finalists who were scheduled to play a league match against each other, a full programme of matches was played.

The defending champions were Chelsea, who retained their title in the 2010 final against Portsmouth, but they lost to Everton in the fourth round. The tournament winners were Manchester City, who defeated Stoke City in the final with Yaya Touré scoring the only goal of the match in the 74th minute.
The FA Cup winners are normally entitled to a place in the next season's UEFA Europa League unless they have already qualified for that tournament or for the UEFA Champions League; because Manchester City qualified for the 2011–12 UEFA Champions League via their top-four finish in the 2010–11 Premier League, Stoke qualified for the 2011–12 UEFA Europa League as runners-up.

Teams

Calendar
The calendar for the 2010–11 FA Cup, as announced by The Football Association:

Qualifying rounds

All of the teams that entered the competition, but were not members of the Premier League or The Football League, had to compete in the qualifying rounds.

First round proper
Teams from Leagues One and Two entered at this stage, along with the winners from the Fourth Round Qualifying. The draw was held on 24 October 2010 with ties played on the weekend of 6–7 November 2010 apart from Rochdale vs FC United of Manchester which was the only match played on 5 November 2010. It was broadcast on ESPN kicking off its FA Cup campaign with the Northern Premier League club shocking their League One counterparts 3–2. ESPN's next match was on 6 November 2010, where Cambridge United and Huddersfield Town played out a scoreless draw. ITV1's first coverage was Southport vs Sheffield Wednesday on 7 November 2010 with the League One side trouncing their Conference National opponents 5–2.

Tipton Town of the Midland Football Alliance and Hythe Town of the Kent League, both from the ninth tier, were the lowest-ranked teams left in the competition at this stage. Both suffered heavy defeats by league opposition.

Second round proper
The matches were played on 26, 27 and 29 November 2010 with replays scheduled for 7, 8 and 9 December. Hartlepool United v Yeovil Town and Notts County v AFC Bournemouth were both postponed on their original date, 26 November, and again on 7 December. They were finally played on 14 December.

FC United of Manchester of the Northern Premier League Premier Division and Swindon Supermarine of the Southern League Premier Division, both from the seventh tier, were the lowest-ranked teams left in the competition at this stage. Swindon Supermarine were narrowly defeated 1–0 by Colchester United, but FC United of Manchester managed to force a replay after a 1–1 draw with Brighton & Hove Albion.

The draw for the second round was notable for the potential meeting of AFC Wimbledon and MK Dons. This would have been the first time the two clubs had met however MK Dons were beaten by Stevenage in their first-round replay.

Third round proper
The draw was held on 28 November 2010 at Wembley Stadium and made by Noel Gallagher of Oasis and Sergio Pizzorno of Kasabian. who bizarrely picked out the balls of the respective clubs that they support (Pizzorno - Leicester City and Gallagher -  Manchester City). Premier League and Football League Championship teams also entered at this stage, joining the winners from the second round and completing the entrants. The lowest ranked team in this round was Dover Athletic of the Conference South, the sixth tier of English football. The tie between Wycombe Wanderers and Hereford United was played later than usual due to the fact that the second round replay between Lincoln City and Hereford was delayed. Arsenal narrowly avoided an upset by scoring a stoppage time penalty in their 1–1 draw with Championship side Leeds United. The highly anticipated match in the third round between Manchester United and Liverpool saw United beat Liverpool 1–0 with a Ryan Giggs second-minute penalty. Championship side Leeds United failed to maintain their good showing against Arsenal by losing 3–1. Also Newcastle suffered a massive upset, losing 3–1 to League Two Stevenage.

Fourth round proper
The draw was held on Sunday 9 January 2011. The lowest ranked team left in the competition was Crawley Town of the Conference National, the fifth tier of English football. Of the other 31 teams, 15 were from the Premier League, 6 were from The Championship, 6 were from League One, and 4 were from League Two. Three matches went to a replay, Everton v Chelsea, Bolton Wanderers v Wigan Athletic and Manchester City v Notts County.

Fifth round proper
The draw was held on Sunday 30 January 2011. For the second consecutive round, the lowest ranked team left in the competition was Crawley Town of the Conference National, the fifth tier of English football. They were the first non-League side to make the fifth round since 1994. Of the other 15 teams, 10 were from the Premier League, two from the Championship and three from League One. One match went to a replay, Leyton Orient v Arsenal.

Sixth round proper
The draw was held on Sunday 20 February 2011. Reading of The Championship defeated Everton in the Fifth Round, and are the last non-Premier League team remaining in the competition, for the second year running. All seven other teams are from the Premier League.

Semi-finals
 
The draw was conducted by Hope Powell and Fabio Capello at Wembley Stadium on Sunday, 13 March 2011, after the result of the Stoke game, but before the end of the Manchester City game. Ties were played on 16/17 April at Wembley. With Manchester City's victory over Reading, it meant that the Semi-Finals of the Cup would be an all-Premier League affair, and in addition, Wembley Stadium would host its first ever Manchester derby game.

Final

Top scorer

Media coverage
In the United Kingdom, ITV were the free to air broadcasters for the third consecutive season while ESPN took over the subscription broadcaster package Setanta Sports held.

International broadcasters

References

External links
 The FA Cup at thefa.com

 
FA Cup seasons
Fa Cup
Fa Cup